Al Habbaniyah or Habbaniya (al-Ḥabbānīyah) is a city 85 km (53 mi) west of Baghdad in Al-Anbar Province, in central Iraq. A military airfield, RAF Habbaniya, was the site of a battle in 1941, during World War II. Lake Habbaniyah is also nearby.

History
On 25 May 1941, Second Battalion of the Fourth Gurkha Rifles (2/4 GR), forming part of 10 Indian Infantry Division, was airlifted to reinforce and secure Habbaniyah, which was a Royal Air Force airfield under threat from Iraqi ground troops and the German Luftwaffe, located in Mosul, and Baghdad. It has 74,217 citizens.

Assyrians from Naqadeh and Urmia, Iran, settled to the city in the early 20th century after Sayfo.

Climate

References

Populated places in Al Anbar Governorate
Populated places on the Euphrates River
Assyrian communities in Iraq